PTT Bulletin Board System (PTT, telnet://ptt.cc) is the largest terminal-based bulletin board system (BBS) based in Taiwan. It was founded by Yi-Chin Tu and other students from the National Taiwan University in 1995 as Professional Technology Temple, and it is currently administered by the Electronic BBS Research Society as a non-commercial and open-source BBS.

PTT has more than 1.5 million registered users, with over 150,000 users online during peak hours. The BBS has over 20,000 boards covering a multitude of topics, and more than 20,000 articles and 500,000 comments are posted every day.

Background
Using the TELNET protocol, PTT provides a quick, free of charge, and open online forum community. Currently, PTT has two branch sites, PTT2 and PTT3. Of the three sites, the main site PTT is largest in scale and capacity, currently handling up to 150,215 visitors online at a time (9 September 2008), making it the largest Chinese language-based BBS in the world.

The main site was founded on 9 September 1995 by Yi-Chin Tu ( Dù Yìjǐn), then a sophomore in the Department of Computer Science and Information Engineering at National Taiwan University. PTT2 was founded in 2000, with the aim of providing a similar system centered around groups and individuals. PTT3, powered by MediaWiki, was founded in 2004 in Washington, D.C., United States for Taiwanese students studying abroad. PTT also provides wiki and blog services for registered users. The PTTwiki service was activated on 5 February 2004 and powered by Tavi wiki system. It is the main wiki service for individuals in Taiwan.

Since 2000, PTT has become the largest online forum in Taiwan due to its increasing number of users. Various issues are enthusiastically discussed on PTT, even to a profound extent generating social impacts in reality. The newspaper and television media started to report on PTT, with journalists assigned to monitor PTT for the latest updates.

PTT is an open source project. The source code is released under GPL 2.0.

Organization
PTT is registered as a student organization at the National Taiwan University. The BBS Technology Research Club was founded in 1999 by several BBS sites at NTU, with Yi-Chin Tu as its leader. In 1999 and 2000, the club held public events on campus for BBS users.

Although PTT is a club and the most famous BBS site in Taiwan, it is not the official BBS site for NTU. The machines and other hardware used to set up PTT was obtained by the administrators without the help of the university, and hence it operates with a high level of freedom. However, it still operates on the NTU network, and hence must abide by its rules and regulations.

System

PTT runs under Linux, while PTT2 runs under FreeBSD 4.11.
The BBS system used by PTT, PTT2, PTT3 is called Open PTT, and is under the GPL.

Development
The code for PTT was originally forked from MapleBBS 2.36 that operated the Sun of Beach BBS. Many programmers and system administrators contributed to the PTT project, with the goals of making PTT efficient in terms for memory usage and disk access and allowing as many users on the system at a single time as possible. The code is licensed under GPL 2.0.

Open PTT

Open PTT is a BBS implementation known for its ease of installation, which is why many BBSes directly run Open PTT as their system. It can be set up with little manual configuration, and it is well documented.

Current PTT

Another fork of the PTT code is known as Current PTT, which is documented at the PttCurrent board. This is the version of the code that runs PTT and PTT2, with many additional features. It currently supports the FreeBSD and Linux platforms.

Commenting: commendation and criticism

PTT implements an article commendation and criticism scheme as its article rating and commenting system, in place since 25 May 2002. PTT was the first Chinese-language BBS to implement such a system. Under this system, users can evaluate an article by giving it a tuei, adding a point, or a hsü, subtracting a point. Individual boards can turn off this feature or set a minimum amount of waiting time between comments.

Sticky posts
Sticky posts reside at the bottom of the forum, right after the most recent posts.

Guardian Angels
The Guardian Angels is a group of experienced PTT users who act as mentors and help answer questions that new users might have. The guardian angels remain anonymous. This system has been in place since May 2004. The 29th of every month is Guardian Angel Day, during which users express their gratitude towards their guardian angels.

PTT Culture

PTT culture and lingo
  pinyin: Wǔ lóu (fifth floor) — the fifth comment of a post, which is often regarded as words of wisdom; also  (fifth floor, please rate this post)
  pinyin: Xiāng mín (villager) — Refers to PTT users. Comes from the line  in the Stephen Chow movie Hail the Judge. This term can also be pejorative, suggesting that users blindly follow other users.
  pinyin: Xīn jǐngchá (rookie police officer) — refers to new users (like the term "newbie").
  pinyin: Kē kē  (kk) — A chuckle, normally , but changed to  when the use of bopomofo is prohibited.
 Pictures — PTT users often ask for pictures.  (wtf, where's the picture?),  (pics or it didn't happen), similar to some western online communities
  pinyin:Yuán po shìzhèng mèi (the original poster is a pretty girl)
  pinyin: Háizi de xuéxí bùnéng děng (our children's education cannot wait)
  pinyin: Dīngdīng shìgè réncái (Tinky Winky is talented) Said ironically, to insinuate someone is stupid
  pinyin: Nǎocán (brain-damaged)
  pinyin: Shǎn kāi ràng zhuānyè de lái (Step aside, let the pro do the job)

Some of the popular lingo used by PTT users are vulgar, which has caused public concern, while others believe that as long as this behavior is contained online and does not affect the user's real-life behavior this is nothing to be concerned about.

Aligned comments and comment art
Aligned comments is a cultural phenomenon in which users align their comments for special effect. Comment art is a phenomenon inspired by the 2chAA community, in which lines of comments collectively form a picture. Since comment art is sometimes perceived as waste of system resources, some of the forums prohibit its use.

PTT blood drive
In 2004, PTT activities coordinator Huan-Yu Chen teamed up with an on-campus organization NTU Blood-Donating Bus to hold a blood drive to solicit blood donations in exchange for PTT money, which led to the creation of the Donate-Blood forum.

PTT logo design contest 2018
The management team of PTT held a logo design contest from May 6, 2018 to July 15, 2018. Users could submit their logo designs by posting on the contest board with their PTT ID as the title of the post. The submission session was May 6, 2018 to June 15, 2018. All PTT users had two weeks (June 16, 2018-June 30, 2018) to vote for their favorite design. The management team then together decided three winners of this contest from ten most voted designs (July 3, 2018-July 13, 2018). The champion (announced on July 15, 2018) was awarded 1,000,000 P coins (currency on PTT) along with other souvenirs. The champion design was posted on the official Facebook page and website for a year.

PTT Boards
The forums are subdivided into boards (看板 pinyin：Kànbǎn, noticeboard or bulletinboard) and named by a string of alphanumeric characters. These boards can be searched as well as ordered by popularity. They can also be added to a user's list of favorite boards.

Incidents and Controversy 
As PTT is a liberal platform for public opinions, it allows netizens to access and comment on social matters easily, including news or specific persons, based on their personal perspective and/or agenda. However, since netizens on PTT do not need to disclose their real names while citing news or publishing their opinions, some netizens abuse their status of anonymity and make undesirable comments. PTT, therefore, is easily used for publishing fake news and for inciting cyberbullying. The death of Cindy Yang (楊又穎) is an occurrence of this, and it is the first time netizens in PTT were made aware of this issue. Cindy Yang, a model and actress, committed suicide in 2015, after suffering from taunts and accusations from various social media, notably PTT.  
The news about Yang’s suicide triggered a heated discussion. Some netizens began to self-examine the bullying culture in PTT. The targets of bullying in PTT are often celebrities and politicians, as well as their families. The most notorious example might be the bullying of Chen Hsing-Yu (陳幸妤), daughter of a former president. She and her boyfriend’s (now husband's) relationship became the cover story of the first issue of The Next Magazine. Subsequently,  corruption incidents attributed to her father, and insider trading allegations against her partner were leveraged for harassment by users of PTT for several years.
Additionally, in 2017, the Islamic Association of Taiwan publicly criticized PTT allowing the users to spread fake news and post hate speech about Muslims, and calling it names such as “garbage religion” or “Muslims are trash” thus the Islamic Association of Taiwan protested against the government to voice concern about abuse of anonymity in PTT. Much of the fake news is copied and recycled by tabloids and even mainstream media and causes foreign media to be confused in particular during election times.

Moreover, anonymity led to more irrational and extreme behavior in other aspects. For example, in 2009, Dell Computer has mispriced  its LCD monitor and notebook products on its official website and this aroused lots of netizens on PTT to go fishing for cheap deals. They mobilized ten and thousands of netizens to order the mispriced items and ordered Dell computer to sell its products at a fraction of its original cost within just a few hours. At the beginning, some netizens ordered a small amount of the mispriced product. Many netizens later began to post photos about their orders and therefore led other netizens in PTT to behave irrationally and extremely. A PTT account with the username "connyli", for instance, posted the photo showing his orders  were valued more than NT$360 million. By 7:00 a.m. the next morning, when Dell urgently closed its online order system, more than 43,000 orders, valued at NT$2 billion, had been placed from PTT causing Dell computer to almost collapse. The court, however, finally ruled against the PTT members of trying to take advantage of erroneous information to force Dell computer to sell below their cost. Thus the case was dismissed. 
But the mob rallying effects of the PTT went on full display in this incident.

The death of Taiwan’s representative in Osaka 
Like all other anonymous or semi-anonymous internet communities in Taiwan, there’s plenty of fake news and many acts of cyberbullying on PTT. In recent years, the most notable is one of Su Chii-Cherng (蘇啟誠), Taiwan's representative in Osaka, who committed suicide in 2018. Su Chii-Cherng left a letter saying he was suffering from hate speech received. His office was accused of not assisting Taiwanese tourists stranded at the Kansai International Airport in the wake of Typhoon Jebi. 
During the Typhoon Jebi crisis, fake news said that the Taiwanese tourist had to identify themselves as Chinese in order to be allowed to board China’s bus that was used during the rescue efforts, and therefore led the other netizens in PTT to begin to criticize Frank Hsieh (謝長廷), Taiwan's representative in Japan. However, soon, a PTT account with the username "idcc" posted messages that claimed the Osaka office was out of Frank Hsieh's control and criticized the Osaka office should take all responsibility for the crisis. This was a untrue because the Osaka office directly reports to Frank Hsieh’s office which was in fact the highest ranking government office of Taiwan in Japan, It was the Taiwan Representative Office. Yet, the Osaka office took the blame from the media and netizens. Su finally found it unbearable and decided to commit suicide. Prosecutors later found that the account’s IP address could be linked directly to Slow Yang (楊蕙如), who is considered as pro-DPP figure and a member of Frank Hsieh’s faction. Furthermore, Slow Yang was accused of paying and asking others to post such fake news in order to protect Frank Hsieh at the expense of Mr. Su’s life.

Manipulation of public opinion by political parties 
According to the interviews from Common Wealth Magazine, one of the biggest business magazines in Taiwan, people try to form public opinions in PTT and seek to influence the larger society especially during an election year.

Han Kuo-Yu and FFASIC 
In April 2019, a PTT account with the username “ken4645” posted an article titled “Is Wang Jin-Pyng (王金平) and Han Kuo-Yu (韓國瑜) related to China's online warriors?” This article, along with several fake photos, alleged and accused that Farmers’ and Fishermen's Association South Information Center (FFASIC) and KMT presidential candidate Han Kuo-Yu received funds from China and tried to purchase Facebook pages for spreading misleading information in order to affect public opinion related to the election. However, the article was later proved to be false. The user spreading the said fake news proved to be linked to the pro-DPP group and thereafter was investigated by the prosecutor.

Tsai Ing-wen’ dissertation 
In June 2019, the Taiwan People News published a column written by Cao Chang-Qing (曹長青) which alleged that President Tsai Ing-Wen (蔡英文) paid off officials at the London School of Economics (LSE) to obtain her Ph.D. This article raised thousands of comments in PTT where many netizens gave their opinions based on this news. However, after several months, LSE officially stated Tsai was correctly awarded a Ph.D. degree in 1984 and proved it is false. But the authenticity of LSE notification is in question.

See also 

 2channel
 4chan
 Digg
 Diigo
 Delicious
 Fark
 Imgur
 MetaFilter
 Reddit
 StumbleUpon
 Slashdot
 Social bookmarking
 Social news
 Web 2.0

References

External links

Ptt WebBBS
PTT: ptt.cc (ssh site)
PTT2: ptt2.cc (ssh site; group and personal boards)
PTT3: ptt3.cc (telnet site; for students studying abroad)
PTT Wiki
PTT Blog
PTT Source (source code)
PTT Video

Bulletin board systems
Taiwanese culture
Free communication software